Ncora Dam is a gravity type dam built by Concor and located on the Tsomo River, near Tsomo, Eastern Cape, South Africa. It was established in 1972 and serves mainly for irrigation purposes. The hazard potential of the dam has been ranked high (3).

See also
List of reservoirs and dams in South Africa
List of rivers of South Africa

References 

 List of South African Dams from the Department of Water Affairs

Dams in South Africa
Dams completed in 1975